Innovative Technologies in Education — an additional educational institution operating in the fields of education, information technologies and economic development aimed at applying new approaches to the teaching process.

General education topics of ITE include ICT literacy development for school teachers, distance learning and online communication, Microsoft Teams, Integrated STEM (Science, Technology, Engineering and Mathematics) education through project-based learning, Integrated Methodology Development using Electronic Resources, in Education Application of Innovation and High Technologies, Development of Communication Skills through ICT for Pedagogical Staff, Use of E-School Platform, Development of Communication Skills in Python Programming and Use of International Polyup Platform.

The enterprise cooperates with the World Bank, Microsoft, UN, UNESCO, UNICEF, Intel, Huawei, as well as with universities of Great Britain, United States of America, Sweden, Latvia, Spain, South Korea and other countries.

Over 25,000 people graduated from ITE last year. Trainings were conducted by more than 200 trainers of ITE.

The center is licensed by the Ministry of Education and Ministry of Economy.

References 

Education in Azerbaijan
Science and technology in Azerbaijan